Alexander Hermann (born 10 December 1991) is an Austrian handball player for VfL Gummersbach and the Austrian national team.

He is the twin brother of Maximilian Hermann.

References

1991 births
Living people
Austrian male handball players
Sportspeople from Linz
Expatriate handball players
Austrian expatriate sportspeople in Germany
Handball-Bundesliga players
HSG Wetzlar players